April Showers is a 1923 American silent romantic film directed by Tom Forman starring Colleen Moore. It is not known whether the film currently survives.

Plot
Danny O'Rourke is the son of a police officer who was killed in the line of duty. Eager to join the police force, Danny fails his exams. The failure causes him to neglect his sweetheart Maggie, whose father is a police lieutenant. His attentions turn instead towards society girl Miriam Welton. When Danny’s sister, Shannon, is arrested for shoplifting, Danny turns to boxing to save her. He works his way towards the championship but discovers the final bought has been rigged. Danny fights anyhow and he is beaten, but it is discovered that a mistake had been made on his exams and he actually was eligible to join the police force after all.

Cast
Colleen Moore as Maggie Muldoon  
Kenneth Harlan as Danny O'Rourke  
Ruth Clifford as Miriam Welton  
Priscilla Bonner as Shannon O'Rourke  
Myrtle Vane as Mrs. O'Rourke  
James Corrigan as Matt Gallagher  
Jack Byron as Flash Irwin  
Ralph Faulkner as Champ Sullivan  
Tom McGuire as Lieutenant Muldoon  
Norman Selby as Ring Manager (as Kid McCoy)  
Danny Goodman as Ring Manager

Background
Filmed in early [1923], April Showers would bring Colleen to the Mayer-Schulberg Studio (formerly the Selig studio). April Showers followed The Nth Commandment, and it was an old-fashioned romantic story billed as having “…the ‘all-Irish-all-star’ cast. The January 23 Los Angeles Times ran a story entitled “She Couldn't Keep Down Her Irish Blood,” which concerned the making of April Showers and managed to tap into the "Irish" persona she had cultivated:

“The piquant Colleen plays the role of a rather tomboyish little Irish girl of plain but honest parents.... Miss Moore lives her parts at home as well as before the camera and in practicing before her grandmother, Mm. Mary Kelly, she finally drew fire from that saint of the household. 
“’Colleen me child,’ said Grandmother Kelly, ‘It's all very well to act like a little hoyden and be rough and tomboyish—but there’s too much of that sort on the screen, me dear. Remember, not all the Irish men are policemen and not all the Irish women are washwomen.... You don’t have to be any wilder because you’re supposed to be Irish.’ 
“’All right, grandmother,’ humbly agreed Colleen, ‘but it’s hard for me not to let myself go—being Irish.’"

Actor Harlan trained with real boxers to prepare for the role. shortly after this film was finished, Colleen would go to work for Associated First National where, with the success of the film Flaming Youth, she would achieve a new level of fame.

References
Notes

Bibliography
Jeff Codori (2012), Colleen Moore; A Biography of the Silent Film Star, McFarland Publishing,(Print , EBook ).

External links

1923 romantic drama films
American romantic drama films
American silent feature films
Films directed by Tom Forman
American black-and-white films
1923 films
Preferred Pictures films
1920s American films
Silent romantic drama films
Silent American drama films